The Comal River is the shortest navigable river in the state of Texas in the United States. Proclaimed the "longest shortest river in the world" by locals, it runs entirely within the city limits of New Braunfels in southeast Comal County. It is a tributary of the Guadalupe River. The Comal begins at Comal Springs in Landa Park and flows  until its junction with the Guadalupe.

The Comal was originally called the Little Guadalupe in early Spanish accounts. After Spaniard Pedro de Rivera y Villalón identified the longer river as the Guadalupe in 1727, the Comal was given its current name. The name means basin or flat dish in Spanish.

Historically, the Comal was used to power watermills and cotton gins by early German settlers, and later to provide hydroelectric power. The river is primarily used for water recreation today, being the location of the original Schlitterbahn water amusement park. The water is administered by the Guadalupe-Blanco River Authority.

The river is also one of only two rivers to host the fountain darter, a fish now in danger of extinction.  The only other river inhabited by the darter is the nearby San Marcos River.

Recreation
Mild currents, clear water, and a host of lost items left behind by tubers make the river a common locale for scuba diving. Because the Comal maintains a temperature of approximately  year round, divers are present in both the summer and the winter.  Thousands of people tube down the Comal River in the spring and summer.  Tubing on the Comal provides a less intense alternative to tubing on the nearby Guadalupe river, where one may encounter frequent rapids and boulders to paddle around. The Schlitterbahn Water Park is built along a  stretch of the river.

See also
 List of rivers of Texas

References

External links

Guadalupe-Blanco River Authority
Comal River Virtual Tour
Photo of Comal River near Comal Springs
Sketch of the Comal River Ferry from A pictorial history of Texas, from the earliest visits of European adventurers, to A.D. 1879, hosted by the Portal to Texas History

Rivers of Texas

Rivers of Comal County, Texas
New Braunfels, Texas